McVille is an unincorporated community in Beech Creek Township, Greene County, Indiana.

History
McVille was originally called McHaleysville, and under the latter name was founded in 1836 by John McHaley. A post office was established at McVille in 1879, and remained in operation until it was discontinued in 1916.

Geography

References

Unincorporated communities in Greene County, Indiana
Unincorporated communities in Indiana
Bloomington metropolitan area, Indiana